Oya is a divinity found in Yoruba religion, Santeria and other belief systems.

Oya or OYA may also refer to:

Places 
 Øya, a neighborhood in Trondheim, Norway
 Oya, Sarawak, a town in Malaysia
 Oya River, a river in Malaysia
 Ōya Station (disambiguation), in Japan
 Oia, Spain, a municipality in Galicia, Spain
 Oya, Raebareli, a village in Uttar Pradesh, India

Other uses 
 OYA, the Oregon Youth Authority, a state agency in the US
 Oya (name), a given name and surname (including a list of persons with the name)
 Oya (comics), a fictional superhero in the Marvel comics series
 Oya (lace), also known as Turkish lace
 Ōya stone, a type of igneous rock
 9602 Oya, a minor planet
 Goya Airport IATA code

See also 

 Oya’oya language, an Austronesian dialect cluster of Papua New Guinea
 Oia (disambiguation)
 Olla (disambiguation)
 Oja (disambiguation)